Petar Genov (born 5 April 1970) is a Bulgarian chess grandmaster (2002).

He was taught how to play chess at the age of 7-8 by his father. He won the Bulgarian Chess Championship in 1993 and 1999 and played for Bulgaria in the 35th Chess Olympiad in Bled 2002. In the same year he came first at Herceg Novi. In 2004, tied for first with Vadim Malakhatko in the 3rd Condom Chess Open.

He is married to Woman International Master Lyubka Genova.

References

External links

1970 births
Living people
Bulgarian chess players
Chess grandmasters
Chess Olympiad competitors